The 2016–17 Pac-12 Conference men's basketball season begins with practices in October 2016 and ends with the 2017 Pac-12 Conference men's basketball tournament in March 2017 at the T-Mobile Arena in Paradise, Nevada. The regular season begins on the first weekend of November 11, 2016 with Arizona-Michigan State, with the conference schedule starting in the last week of December 28, 2016 with UCLA-Oregon.

This is the sixth season under the Pac-12 Conference name and the 58th since the conference was established under its current charter as the Athletic Association of Western Universities in 1959. Including the history of the Pacific Coast Conference, which operated from 1915 to 1959 and is considered by the Pac-12 as a part of its own history, this is the Pac-12's 102nd season of men's basketball.

Preseason

 October 21, 2016 – Pac-12 men's basketball media day, Pac-12 Networks Studios, San Francisco, Calif.

() first place votes

Recruiting classes

Rankings

The Pac-12 had 4 teams ranked and 3 others receiving votes in the preseason Coaches' Poll. It had four teams ranked in the preseason AP Poll and one other receiving votes.

Pac-12 regular season

Conference schedule
This table summarizes the head-to-head results between teams in conference play.

Points scored

Through March 6, 2017

Head coaches

Note: Stats shown are before the beginning of the season. Overall and Pac-12 records are from time at current school.

Postseason

Pac-12 tournament

The conference tournament is scheduled for Wednesday–Saturday March 8–11, 2017 at the T-Mobile Arena, Paradise, NV. Oregon and Arizona were seeded one and two respectively. The top four teams had a bye on the first day, March 8, 2017. Teams were seeded by conference record, with ties broken by record between the tied teams followed by record against the regular-season champion, if necessary.

NCAA tournament

National Invitation Tournament

Awards and honors

Player of the Week

 Nov. 14 – Tres Tinkle, Oregon State
 Nov. 21 – Charlie Moore, California
 Nov. 28 – Lonzo Ball, UCLA
 Dec. 5 – T. J. Leaf, UCLA
 Dec. 12 – Derrick White, Colorado
 Dec. 19 – T. J. Leaf, UCLA (2)

 Dec. 25 – Jordan McLaughlin, USC
 Jan. 2 – Dillon Brooks, Oregon
 Jan. 9 – Ivan Rabb, California
 Jan. 16 – Bryce Alford, UCLA
 Jan. 23 – Lauri Markkanen, Arizona
 Jan. 30 – Shaqquan Aaron, USC

 Feb. 6 – Dillon Brooks, Oregon (2)
 Feb. 13 – Lonzo Ball, UCLA (2)
 Feb. 20 – Lauri Markkanen, Arizona (2)
 Feb. 27 – Dillon Brooks, Oregon (3)
 Mar. 6 –  Jordan McLaughlin, USC (2)

All-Americans

AP
First team
 Lonzo Ball (UCLA)
Second team
 Dillon Brooks (Oregon)
Third team
 Markelle Fultz (Washington)
 Lauri Markkanen (Arizona)

USBWA
First team
 Lonzo Ball (UCLA)
Second team
 Dillon Brooks (Oregon)

USBWA: Wayman Tisdale Freshman of the Year
 Lonzo Ball (UCLA)

NABC
First team
 Lonzo Ball (UCLA)
 Dillon Brooks (Oregon)
 Markelle Fultz (Washington)
 Lauri Markkanen  (Arizona)
 Ivan Rabb (California)
Second team
 T. J. Leaf (UCLA)
 Kyle Kuzma (Utah)
 Reid Travis (Stanford)
 Josh Hawkinson (Washington State)
 Derrick White (Colorado)

Sporting News
First team
 Lonzo Ball (UCLA)
Second team
 Dillon Brooks (Oregon)
Third team
 Lauri Markkanen (Arizona)
 Markelle Fultz (Washington)

All-District
USBWA

District VIII: All-District Team
 Kyle Kuzma (Utah)
 Derrick White (Colorado)

District IX: Player of the Year
 Lonzo Ball (UCLA)
District IX: All-District Team
 Lonzo Ball (UCLA)
 Jordan Bell (Oregon)
 Dillon Brooks (Oregon)
 Markelle Fultz (Washington)
 T. J. Leaf (UCLA)
 Lauri Markkanen (Arizona)
 Ivan Rabb (California)

Conference awards
Voting was by conference coaches.

Individual awards

All-Pac-12

First Team

Second Team

All-Freshman Team

All-Defensive Team

NBA draft

References